Karel Lang (born 9 June 1958) is a Czech former professional ice hockey goaltender.

Career 
He represented Czechoslovakia in the 1980 Winter Olympics, where his team finished 5th in the rankings. Between 1990 and 2001 he played for the Krefeld Pinguine in the Eishockey-Bundesliga and the Deutsche Eishockey Liga.

Family 
Lang's son Lukas Lang also played professionally in Germany.

References

External links

1958 births
Living people
Czech ice hockey goaltenders
Czechoslovak ice hockey goaltenders
HK Dukla Trenčín players
Füchse Duisburg players
HC Kometa Brno players
Krefeld Pinguine players
Ice hockey players at the 1980 Winter Olympics
Olympic ice hockey players of Czechoslovakia
Ice hockey people from Brno
Czechoslovak expatriate sportspeople in Germany
Czechoslovak expatriate ice hockey people
Czech expatriate ice hockey players in Germany
Naturalized citizens of Germany
Czech ice hockey coaches
Czech emigrants to Germany
German ice hockey coaches